Wolfgang Fortner (12 October 1907 – 5 September 1987) was a German composer, composition teacher and conductor.

Life 
Fortner was born in Leipzig.  From his parents, who were both singers, Fortner very early on had intense contact with music.

In 1927 he began his studies at the Leipzig Conservatory (organ with Karl Straube, composition with Hermann Graubner) and at University of Leipzig, (philosophy with Hans Driesch, musicology with Theodor Kroyer, and German studies with Hermann August Korff) . While still a student, two of his early compositions were publicly performed: Die vier marianischen Antiphonen at the Lower Rhineland Festival in Düsseldorf in 1928, and his First String Quartet in Königsberg in 1930 .

In 1931 he completed his studies with the State Exam for a high teaching office, after he accepted a lectureship in music theory at the Hochschule für Kirchenmusik Heidelberg. There his music was attacked as Cultural Bolshevism. In 1935 and 1936 Fortner created the Heidelberg Chamber Orchestra with which he supported New Music and undertook expanded concert journeys for "armed forces support", from Scandinavia to the Netherlands to Greece. In the same year he also took over the directorship of the orchestra of the Hitler Youth of Heidelberg, a string orchestra, formed from juvenile laymen, whose directorship changed in 1939 again. In 1940, he was drafted into the army as a medical soldier.

After the end of the war, Fortner underwent Denazification and was found not affected by professional disqualification. Fortner moved to the Heidelberg Kohlhof and there a group of very young students formed around him, who showed interest in the modern music of 1933.  In 1946 he joined the circle of the Darmstadt Internationale Ferienkurse für Neue Musik, and taught within that framework. In 1954 he became a professor for composition at the North-West German Music Academy in Detmold, then from 1957 up to his retirement in 1973 taught in Freiburg. After the death of Karl Amadeus Hartmann, in 1964 he took up the leadership of the Musica Viva concerts, which he directed until 1978 .

Together with eleven other composer-friends (Conrad Beck, Luciano Berio, Pierre Boulez, Benjamin Britten, Henri Dutilleux, Alberto Ginastera, Cristóbal Halffter, Hans Werner Henze, Heinz Holliger, Klaus Huber, and Witold Lutosławski), he was asked by Russian cellist Mstislav Rostropovich, on the occasion of the 70th birthday of the Swiss composer and art patron Paul Sacher, to write a composition for cello solo using the notes of his name (eS, A, C, H, E, Re). Wolfgang Fortner created the theme and three variations Zum spielen für den 70. Geburtstag, Thema und Variationen für Violoncello Solo. These compositions were partially presented in Zurich on 2 May 1976.

Wolfgang Fortner died in Heidelberg in 1987, aged 79.

Prizes
1948 Schreker-Prize Berlin.
1953 Louis Spohr Prize Brunswick.
1955 Bearer of the "Great Prize of Art-Music" of North-Rhine/Westphalia.
1955 Member of the Academy of the Beautiful Arts of Berlin.
1956 Member of the Bayerische Akademie der Schönen Künste of Munich.
1957 President of the German section of the ISCM (from 1971).
1960 Bach Prize of the Free and Hanseatic City of Hamburg.
1975 President of the Dramatists' Union.
1977 Reinhold Schneider Prize of Freiburg.
1977 Grand Medal of Service of the Federal Republic of Germany
1977 Honorary Doctorate of the Universities of Heidelberg and Freiburg.

Notable students
Among his students were composers Günther Becker, Arthur Dangel, Friedhelm Döhl, Hans Ulrich Engelmann, Diego H. Feinstein, Peter Förtig, Volkmar Fritsche, Hans Werner Henze, Carl Johnson, Milko Kelemen, Rudolf Kelterborn, Karl Michael Komma, Arghyris Kounadis, Ton de Kruyf, Uwe Lohrmann, Wolfgang Ludewig, Bruce MacCrombie, Roland Moser, Diether de la Motte, Nam June Paik, Graciela Paraskevaidis, Robert HP Platz, Rolf Riehm, Wolfgang Rihm, Griffith Rose, Mauricio Rosenmann, Dieter Schönbach, Manfred Stahnke, Henk Stam, Karen Tarlow, Peter Westergaard, Hans Zender, Bernd Alois Zimmermann, Heinz Werner Zimmermann, conductors Thomas Baldner and Arturo Tamayo and translator Hans Wollschläger.

Selected works

Operas 
 Bluthochzeit.  Lyric Tragedy in 2 Acts/7 Pictures, libretto by the composer after the drama  Bodas se sangre by Federico García Lorca in Enrique Beck's German translation (1957)
 Corinna.  Opera buffa in one act after a comedy by Gérard de Nerval (1958)
 In seinem Garten liebt Don Perlimplin Belisa. Opera after Federico García Lorca (1962)
 Elisabeth Tudor. Opera in three acts after a libretto by Mattias Braun  (1972) at the Deutsche Oper Berlin, with Helga Dernesch and William B. Murray
 That time. Scenic cantata after Samuel Beckett (1977)

Ballets
 Die weiße Rose. Ballet after Oscar Wilde (1950)
 Die Witwe von Ephesus. Pantomime after a scenario of Petronius
 Carmen (Bizet Collagen). Music for a ballet by John Cranko (1971)

Other works
 String quartet no. 1 (published 1930)
 Concerto for organ and strings (published 1932)
 Concertino in G minor for viola and chamber orchestra (1934)
 Sonatina for piano (1935)
 Concerto for string orchestra (1935?)  
 Sinfonia concertante (published 1937)
 String quartet no. 2 (published 1938)
 Concerto for Piano and Orchestra (published 1943)
 Sonata for violin and piano (1945)
 Concerto for Violin and Orchestra (1947; written for Gerhard Taschner)
 Sonata for flute and piano (1947)
 Symphony 1947 (1947)
 String quartet no. 3 (1948) 
 Phantasie über die Tonfolge BACH for Orchestra (1950)
 Concerto for Cello and orchestra (1951)
 The Creation (Die Schōpfung) for middle voice and orchestra (1954). Recorded by Dietrich Fischer-Dieskau (with the Sinfonie Orchester des Norddeutschen Rundfunks conducted by Hans Schmidt-Isserstedt.)
 Impromptus for large Orchestra (1957)
 Die Pfingstgeschichte nach Lukas, Evangelist-scoring for Tenor solo,  six-part choir, 11 instruments and organ (1963)
 Triplum for 3 Klaviere and Orchestra (1965/6)
 Prismen for Flute, Oboe, Harp, Percussion and Orchestra (1967)
 Marginalien. Dem Andenken eines guten Hundes. For Orchestra (1969)
 Zyklus for Cello and Chamber Orchestra without strings (1970)
 Machaut-Balladen for Singer and Orchestra (1974)
 String Quartet no. 4 (1975) 
 Triptychon for Orchestra (1977)
 Two string trios (1951, 1983)
 Piano trio (1978)

References

Notes

External links
 
 CV of Wolfgang Fortner

1907 births
1987 deaths
20th-century classical composers
20th-century German composers
20th-century German conductors (music)
20th-century German male musicians
Composers awarded knighthoods
German male classical composers
German male conductors (music)
German opera composers
Academic staff of the Hochschule für Musik Detmold
Knights Commander of the Order of Merit of the Federal Republic of Germany
Leipzig University alumni
LGBT classical composers
Male opera composers
Musicians from Leipzig
People from the Kingdom of Saxony
Pupils of Hermann Grabner
Twelve-tone and serial composers
University of Music and Theatre Leipzig alumni
German Army personnel of World War II
German LGBT musicians
20th-century German LGBT people